Theia is a Titan in Greek mythology. 

Theia or THEIA may also refer to:

Science and technology
 Theia (planet), a hypothesized planet involved in the creation of the Moon
 Eclipse Theia, an integrated development environment framework 
 Telescope for Habitable Exoplanets and Interstellar/Intergalactic Astronomy, a proposed space telescope

Other uses
 Theia (horse), a racehorse
 Theia (Oceanid), a minor deity in Greek mythology
 Theia (singer), a singer from New Zealand
 Teia, last king of the Ostrogoths in Italy

See also
 Teia (disambiguation)
 Thea (disambiguation)
 Thia (disambiguation)